The smc Pentax-D FA 50mm f/2.8 Macro lens is a normal macro lens for the Pentax K-mount.  While optimized for digital use, it offers full frame 135 film coverage.  The lens is capable of reaching 1:1 magnification.

External links

SMC Pentax-D FA 50mm f/2.8 Macro
Bojidar Dimitrov's Pentax K-Mount Page: D FA 50/2.8 Macro

50
Pentax 050mm f/2.8
Camera lenses introduced in 2004